This is a summary of the electoral history of Jack Marshall, Prime Minister of New Zealand (1972), Leader of the National Party (1972–74), and Member of Parliament for  (1946–54) then  (1954–75).

Parliamentary elections

1946 election

1949 election

1951 election

1954 election

1957 election

1960 election

1963 election

1966 election

1969 election

1972 election

Leadership elections

1972 leadership election

Notes

References

Marshall, Jack